Han Sang-guk (born 2 November 1978) is a North Korean short track speed skater. He competed in two events at the 1998 Winter Olympics.

References

1978 births
Living people
North Korean male short track speed skaters
Olympic short track speed skaters of North Korea
Short track speed skaters at the 1998 Winter Olympics
Place of birth missing (living people)
20th-century North Korean people
Short track speed skaters at the 2007 Asian Winter Games